Cystopteris montana, previously classified as Athyrium montanum, is a species of fern known by the common name mountain bladderfern. It occurs throughout the high latitudes of the Northern Hemisphere, in Eurasia, Greenland, and Alaska, and throughout Canada. It is also present in the higher elevations in Colorado farther south.

This fern produces a creeping, cordlike, scaly stem. The leaves are up to 45 centimeters long. The blades are borne on a petiole with a dark base and a light-colored end. The petiole is longer than the blade. The blade is pentagonal in shape and divided into leaflets which are subdivided into many lobed and toothed segments. The sori are covered in hairy, whitish, cup-shaped indusia.

This fern grows in moist mountain habitat, such as forests near streams.

References

External links
CalPhotos Photo Gallery

montana
Ferns of Asia
Ferns of Europe
Ferns of the Americas
Ferns of Canada
Ferns of the United States
Flora of the Northern United States
Flora of Alaska
Flora of Greenland